Louis Wardlaw Miles (March 23, 1873 – June 26, 1944), was a World War I Medal of Honor recipient.

He is buried in Green Mount Cemetery, Baltimore, Maryland.

Biography
Louis Miles was born in 1873 in Baltimore, Maryland. He entered service in Princeton, New Jersey and served as an officer in the United States Army during World War I and served as a captain in the 308th Infantry, 77th Division. He was awarded the Medal of Honor for his bravery in action near Revillon, France on September 14, 1918.

Medal of Honor citation
Rank and organization. Captain, U.S. Army, 308th Infantry, 77th Division. Place and date: Near Revillon, France, September 14, 1918. Entered service at: Princeton, N.J. Born: March 23, 1873, Baltimore, Md. G.O. No.: 44, W.D., 1919. 

Citation:

Volunteered to lead his company in a hazardous attack on a commanding trench position near the Aisne Canal, which other troops had previously attempted to take without success. His company immediately met with intense machinegun fire, against which it had no artillery assistance, but Capt. Miles preceded the first wave and assisted in cutting a passage through the enemy's wire entanglements. In so doing he was wounded 5 times by machinegun bullets, both legs and 1 arm being fractured, whereupon he ordered himself placed on a stretcher and had himself carried forward to the enemy trench in order that he might encourage and direct his company, which by this time had suffered numerous casualties. Under the inspiration of this officer's indomitable spirit his men held the hostile position and consolidated the front line after an action lasting 2 hours, at the conclusion of which Capt. Miles was carried to the aid station against his will.

See also

List of Medal of Honor recipients
List of Medal of Honor recipients for World War I

References

1873 births
1944 deaths
United States Army personnel of World War I
United States Army Medal of Honor recipients
United States Army officers
World War I recipients of the Medal of Honor
Burials at Green Mount Cemetery
Military personnel from Baltimore